The 31st National Film Awards, presented by Ministry of Information, Bangladesh to felicitate the best of Bangladeshi Cinema released in the year 2006. Bangladesh National Film Awards is a film award ceremony in Bangladesh established in 1975 by Government of Bangladesh.  Every year, a national panel appointed by the government selects the winning entry, and the award ceremony is held in Dhaka. Chief Adviser Dr. Fakhruddin Ahmed presented the awards at the Bangladesh-China Friendship Conference Centre on October 23, 2008.

List of winners
An eleven-member jury board chaired by the additional secretary of the Ministry of Information selected the winners in 16 different categories.

Merit Awards

Technical Awards

See also
 Bachsas Film Awards
 Meril Prothom Alo Awards
 Ifad Film Club Award
 Babisas Award

References

External links

National Film Awards (Bangladesh) ceremonies
2006 film awards
2008 awards in Bangladesh
2008 in Dhaka
October 2008 events in Bangladesh